In telecommunication, the term terminal equipment has the following meanings:

 Communications equipment at either end of a communications link, used to permit the stations involved to accomplish the mission for which the link was established.
 In radio-relay systems, equipment used at points where data are inserted or derived, as distinct from equipment used only to relay a reconstituted signal.
 Telephone and telegraph switchboards and other centrally located equipment at which communications circuits are terminated.

See also
 Customer-premises equipment
 Data terminal equipment, an end instrument that converts user information into signals for transmission or reconverts the received signals into user information

References

Telecommunications equipment